Tiago João Targino da Silva (born 6 June 1986), known as Targino, is a Portuguese former professional footballer who played as a winger.

Club career
Targino was born in Beja, Alentejo. The son of a Brazilian who played for a host of Portuguese clubs such as C.D. Beja, Portimonense S.C. and S.C. Olhanense, he started his professional career in 2004 with Vitória de Guimarães, having joined their youth academy two years before. He made his Primeira Liga debut on 12 December 2004 in a 3–1 away win against F.C. Penafiel, and finished his first season with two goals, notably in a 1–0 home victory over S.C. Beira-Mar where he scored in the 90th minute.

In January 2008, Targino was loaned to Turkish Süper Lig's Manisaspor. He had started the campaign with Vitória, netting in a 1–0 home defeat of C.D. Nacional on 17 September 2007, but received relatively little playing time.

On 11 July 2008, Targino was again loaned, joining Danish Superliga side Randers FC. He made his league debut against Brøndby IF as a late substitute in a 3–0 away win, again coming from the bench in the next game with FC Nordsjælland. After teammate Mikkel Beckmann was injured against FC Midtjylland, he featured in the starting lineup the following three matches, as a right winger. He scored his only goal on 19 April 2009, in a 2–0 victory at the same opponent.

Targino returned to Guimarães for 2009–10 but, midway through the season, suffered a serious cruciate ligament injury which put him out of action for nearly one year. On 8 November 2010, in his second appearance after returning, he came from the bench and scored twice to help his team come from behind to win 3–2 at Sporting CP, the Minho club's first win in Lisbon in 14 years.

Targino' last season in the Portuguese top tier was 2012–13, with Olhanense. The following was spent in the Cypriot First Division with AEL Limassol after leaving the Algarve due to unpaid wages and, subsequently, from the age of 28 until his retirement, he played mostly in the Portuguese amateur leagues, with a brief spell in the Andorran Primera Divisió as well.

International career
On 11 September 2007, Targino won his first cap for Portugal at under-21 level, when he replaced Paulo Machado early into the second half of an eventual 4–0 win against Montenegro in the 2009 UEFA European Championship qualifiers. The following month, against the same adversary and in the same stage, he scored his only goal (2–1 victory in Podgorica).

References

External links

1986 births
Living people
People from Beja, Portugal
Portuguese people of Brazilian descent
Sportspeople from Beja District
Portuguese footballers
Association football wingers
Primeira Liga players
Liga Portugal 2 players
Campeonato de Portugal (league) players
C.D. Beja players
Vitória S.C. players
Vitória F.C. players
S.C. Olhanense players
C.D. Trofense players
Lusitano G.C. players
Clube Olímpico do Montijo players
Clube Caçadores das Taipas players
Süper Lig players
Manisaspor footballers
Danish Superliga players
Randers FC players
Cypriot First Division players
AEL Limassol players
Jagiellonia Białystok players
Girabola players
Primera Divisió players
FC Lusitanos players
Portugal youth international footballers
Portugal under-21 international footballers
Portuguese expatriate footballers
Expatriate footballers in Turkey
Expatriate men's footballers in Denmark
Expatriate footballers in Cyprus
Expatriate footballers in Poland
Expatriate footballers in Angola
Expatriate footballers in Andorra
Portuguese expatriate sportspeople in Turkey
Portuguese expatriate sportspeople in Denmark
Portuguese expatriate sportspeople in Cyprus
Portuguese expatriate sportspeople in Poland
Portuguese expatriate sportspeople in Angola
Portuguese expatriate sportspeople in Andorra